HNLMS Luymes (A803) is a hydrographic survey vessel of the Royal Netherlands Navy. The Luymes has a sister ship, . Luymes is named after the hydrographer Johan Lambertus Hendrikus Luymes (1869–1943) who was head of Hydrography from 1920 to 1934.

Construction and service
The ship was built in the Netherlands from a Romanian-built hull. The current Luymes is the third hydrographic vessel with this name although the first ship of this name never entered service. The ships have different tasks: surveying the sea, operating as guard ship, representing the Netherlands at home and abroad, assisting maritime scientific surveys by the Ministry of Defence and assisting rescue operations.

References

Snellius-class hydrographic survey vessels
Survey ships
Auxiliary ships of the Royal Netherlands Navy